Mandagere is a small village in Mandya district of Karnataka state, India.

Location
Mandagere is located on the road from Kikkeri to Holenarasipura.

Transportation
Mandagere Railway Station is a station on the Mysore-Arasikere railway line. Only slow passenger trains stop at the station.

See also
 Kikkeri
 Holenarasipura
 Dabbeghatta

Image gallery

References

Villages in Mandya district